Derince Belediyespor Women's Football is the women's football team of the Turkish multi-sport club of Derince Belediyespor, a.k.a. Derince Spor A.Ş., based in Derince district of Kocaeli, Turkey.

History
Derince Belediyespor entered the national competition in the Turkish Women's Second League's 2011–12 season playing in the Division Marmara A. The team was promoted to the Women's First League after defeating Marmara Üniversitesispor in the final match of the play-offs. In 2012–13, in their first season in the top women's league, they ranked 6th. The team finished the 2013–14 season in the third place ahead of Kdz. Ereğlispor.

Derince Belediyespor withdrew from the Women's First League one week before the beginning of the 2014–15 season and two days before the deadline of the footballer transfer term. They did not show at the scheduled first match against Adana İdmanyurduspor. They finished the season at the bottom of the league list without playing any game. Relegated to the Women's Second League, the team did not show up at any match of the 2015–16 season.

Colors and badge
Derince Belediyespor's colors are navy and yellow. The club's badge features Turkish flag in the upper left quarter, and the striped club colors in the upper right quarter. The club's title is shown in the middle bar. The lower half is reserved for the club initials "db" with club's establishment year "1994" on the club colors navy-yellow.

Stadium
The team play their home matches at the Derince Belediye Stadium. Its ground is covered by artificial turf.

Statistics

Honors
Turkish Women's Second Football League
 Winners: 2011–12

Turkish Women's First Football League
 Third places: 2013–14

See also
 Turkish women in sports

References

 
Women's football clubs in Turkey
Association football clubs established in 2011
2011 establishments in Turkey
Defunct football clubs in Turkey